Jaime Heliodoro Rodríguez Calderón (born 28 December 1957 in Ejido Pablillo, Galeana, Nuevo León), sometimes referred to by his nickname "El Bronco", is a Mexican politician. He served as the Governor of the northern state of Nuevo León from 2016 to 2017 and from 2018 to 2021. He is the first independent candidate to have won a governorship in Mexico. He served as mayor of García, Nuevo León (2009–2012) while a member of the Institutional Revolutionary Party (PRI), and was best known for his hard-line stance against organized crime. Rodríguez won the 2015 race for Governor as an independent candidate on June 7, 2015, winning half the votes of the election compared to his traditional party competitors, who split the remainder of the votes. He served as governor from 4 October 2015 until 31 December 2017, when he formally became candidate in the 2018 presidential race. He lost, only attaining 5% of the popular vote and resumed his term as governor.

Early life
Jaime Heliodoro Rodríguez Calderón was born on 28 December 1957, in Ejido Pablillo, a municipality of Galeana, Nuevo León. He was the fourth of ten children born to Lichita Calderon and Rodolfo Rodríguez.

Rodríguez attended primary school at Escuadron 201 in Ejido Pablillo. He attended secondary school at Miguel Hidalgo in Galeana.

Rodríguez majored in Agricultural Engineering in the Autonomous University of Nuevo León and graduated in 1982. According to Jaime, this was made possible by Don Protacio Rodriguez, owner of Transportes Tamaulipas (now Grupo Senda). Don Protacio gave Rodríguez a card that allowed him to travel to Monterrey for his studies. Toward the end of his studies he performed a symbolic strike at the university, calling on governor Alfonso Martínez Domínguez to increase support for public transportation. After the strike, and with the support of the governor, he established a scholarship for poor students struggling to pay for their education.

Upon graduation, he joined the Institutional Revolutionary Party and worked for Governor Martinez Domínguez.

Career

Member of the PRI
As a member of the PRI, Rodríguez served as a federal deputy in 1992, a local MP in 1997, and Mayor of García. During his term as mayor of García, Rodríguez was the target of violent attacks by Los Zetas. As a mayor he fought to reduced crime in this municipality. The 2013 documentary El Bronco sin Miedo ('The Bronco Without Fear') recounted the attacks. He also invested in education and social development programs in Garcia.

Leaving the PRI and running as an independent

On 3 December 2014, citing disappointment with rising corruption within the PRI, Rodríguez expressed his intentions to renounce his political party to run as an independent candidate for Governor of the state of Nuevo León. Soon after, he left the PRI and ran as an independent candidate.

First independent Governor of Nuevo León
By the second week of January his supporters collected 150,000 signatures, exceeding the 103,000 required to meet the 3% of the population minimum for independent candidates to get on the ballot. By February he had more than 334,000 signatures. In the 2015 election, Rodríguez ran against the PRI's Ivonne Alvarez  and PAN's Felipe Cantu.  Election authorities officially added his name on 2 March, and Rodríguez won the election.

Claims of lack of news media coverage

On 11 September 2016, during a Live-Television News broadcast from "Monterrey al Dia," Televisa news reporter, Karla Minaya said, "We have to ensure that the governor, for sure, is mentioned as little as possible." The Mexican newspaper El Universal published on social media a video of the event, which was covered by national news media although Televisa didn't mention the story and declined to comment. Rodríguez's predecessor Rodrigo Medina de la Cruz had spent 4 billion pesos on bribing television news media (Televisa included), to clean his image.

Rodríguez vowed to not spend a single peso in news media coverage. He claims that Televisa news unfairly mention him the least possible, or with biased news coverage of unfair criticisms and defamation. In Rodríguez's own words, "There's 314 denouncements of stolen cars, we retrieved 229, but since we didn't bribe Televisa, Multimedios and TV Azteca they don't show it. We have disbanded a band of thieves of cars and trucks. We have said it on every press round, but Televisa, Multimedios and TV Azteca don't show it."

Presidential campaign 2018

Rodríguez's bid to run in the presidential election 2018, again as an independent, initially didn't reach the required number of signatures to appear on the ballot, but his attorney Javier Náñez Pro appealed to the Federal Electoral Tribunal, which ordered the National Electoral Institute to register him as candidate.

During a debate in April Jaime said "We have to cut off the hands of those who rob. It's that simple." As a result, Rodríguez was trending ahead of the other candidates on Twitter during the debate.

Jaime Rodríguez later proposed to bring back the death penalty (which was officially abolished in Mexico in 2005 and last used by the Mexican government in 1961) for drug traffickers, hijackers, infanticides and serial killers.

According to exit polls, Rodríguez Calderón only attained about 5% of the vote and recognized  Andrés Manuel López Obrador's victory within an hour of the polls closing.

On September 25, 2019, the Federal Electoral Tribunal approved the validity of sanctioning Rodriguez Calderon for using 572 state employees to gather signatures for his 2018 candidacy. They also approved an MXN $153,384 (U.S. $7,800) fine for using public resources to promote his 2014-2015 campaign for governor. Ramirez plans to appeal to the Supreme Court (SCJN).

Return as Governor of Nuevo León
Following his loss in the presential election, Rodríguez Calderón submitted a request to the Nuevo León government to become governor again.

Personal life
Jaime Rodríguez Calderón has had six children and has been married three times. His first wife was María Eugenia Gutiérrez, with whom he had two children: Zoraida Rodríguez Gutiérrez and Jaime Lizenco Rodríguez Gutiérrez, was killed in October 2009 in a vehicular accident while being pursued by criminals. His second marriage was with Silvia Mireya González, with whom he had his daughter Jimena Rodríguez González. His third marriage was on 25 January 2006 with Adalina Dávalos Martínez, with whom he has had three children: Valentina, Victoria and Emiliano; he also adopted Alejandro, a son of his current wife from another relationship.

References

1957 births
Living people
Autonomous University of Nuevo León alumni
Governors of Nuevo León
Mexican political people
Candidates in the 2018 Mexican presidential election
Independent politicians in Mexico
Members of the Congress of Nuevo León